Salph End is a village located in the Borough of Bedford in Bedfordshire, England.

Officially, Salph End is one of the hamlets (or "Ends") of Renhold, and is the westernmost settlement within the civil parish. However, it is also one of the largest and most distinct settlements within Renhold, meaning that Salph End can be considered a separate village in its own right.

Hamlets in Bedfordshire
Borough of Bedford